"The One with the Thumb" is the third episode of Friends first season. It first aired on the NBC network in the United States on October 6, 1994. This episode sees Chandler (Matthew Perry) pick up his old smoking addiction, a habit that the rest of the group finds hard to get him to break. Only Alan (Geoffrey Lower), the new boyfriend of Monica (Courteney Cox), can convince Chandler to drop the habit. The gang falls in love with Alan, but Monica does not see a future with him and the two break up, much to the disappointment of the friends. Meanwhile, Phoebe (Lisa Kudrow) struggles to get rid of all the free money she is receiving, including $7,000 from a soda company when she finds a severed thumb in her drink. She uses the money to pay Chandler to stop smoking.

Plot
At the beginning of the episode, Chandler helps Joey rehearse for an audition. The rehearsal calls for Joey to smoke a cigarette, and as Joey is not a smoker and coughs after taking a drag, Chandler, who used to smoke, demonstrates the "proper" smoking technique to Joey. But as he begins to take a few drags, he becomes addicted and picks up his old habit again. Throughout the episode, the gang try to persuade him to quit, which irritates him greatly. He defends himself by saying it is just a flaw of his, and claims that they are being hypocritical, as they all have their own irritating habits (e.g. Monica's snorting, Joey's knuckle-cracking, Phoebe chewing her hair, and Ross's over pronouncing of every word).

Phoebe discovers her bank has accidentally credited her with an extra $500. The gang persuades her to keep the money, but she decides to return it. However, instead of taking back the money, the bank gives her another $500 and a football phone. Not wanting to keep either the money or the phone, she gives both to Lizzy, a homeless woman. Lizzy buys a soda for Phoebe, who, upon opening the can, discovers a severed thumb floating in the soda. The soda company gives Phoebe $7,000.

Monica is afraid to introduce her new boyfriend Alan to the gang for fear of them ridiculing him and driving him away, as they have apparently done in the past with her other dates. Much to her surprise, the gang can find no fault with Alan, and enjoy his company very much. Alan even convinces Chandler to stop smoking in a very brief telephone conversation after repeated failed attempts by the gang. However, Monica does not quite share the gang's enthusiasm for Alan, and decides to break up with him. Ironically, he tells her that he cannot stand the gang. Monica does not tell them about this in order to spare their feelings.

Chandler tries using patches to quit smoking, but gives up at the end of the episode, and announces he is getting cigarettes. Phoebe then offers him the $7,000 in return for not smoking again; Chandler gladly obliges.

Reception
In the original broadcast, the episode was viewed by 19.5 million viewers.

Sam Ashurst from Digital Spy ranked it #124 on their ranking of the 236 Friends episodes, and called it a "strong, early episode".

Telegraph & Argus also ranked "The One with the Thumb" #124 on their ranking of the 236 Friends episodes. They wrote that the show stealer was Chandler's line "Oh, Satan’s minions at work again…".

The A.V. Club wrote, "the Alan storyline is pretty great, particularly because it extends that sense from the first episode that Monica's friends are all very invested in her love life".

References

1994 American television episodes
Friends (season 1) episodes
Television episodes directed by James Burrows